Maximilian Watzka (born 25 May 1986) is a German former professional football player.

Career 
Watzka began his career in the youth department of his home town club VfB Leipzig. In 2004, he moved to local rivals FC Sachsen Leipzig where he played in 76 NOFV-Oberliga Süd matches, scoring 9 goals. He also played in a match in the DFB-Pokal in 2005.

For the 2007-08 season, Watzka signed a professional contract with then-2nd Bundesliga side Kickers Offenbach. However, he only played in 13 matches, mostly as a substitute, and only was on the pitch for an average 20 minutes. He did not score any goals. Here he also played in one DFB-Pokal match.

After his rather disappointing spell at Offenbach Watzka moved to Regionalliga Nord side 1. FC Magdeburg where he quickly established himself as a first team regular. He played in all but one match and spent an average of 81 minutes on the pitch.

References 

1986 births
Living people
German footballers
Association football midfielders
1. FC Lokomotive Leipzig players
FC Sachsen Leipzig players
Kickers Offenbach players
1. FC Magdeburg players
RB Leipzig players
SV Eintracht Trier 05 players
2. Bundesliga players
FC Viktoria 1889 Berlin players
Footballers from Leipzig